Events from 2022 in Tuvalu.

Incumbents 
 Monarch: Elizabeth II (until 8 September); then Charles III 
 Governor-General: Sir Tofiga Vaevalu Falani 
 Prime Minister: Kausea Natano

Events 
Ongoing – COVID-19 pandemic in Oceania; COVID-19 pandemic in Tuvalu

 24 August – A drought and a shortage of drinking water on the islands of Nanumea, Nui, and Niutao.
 8 September – Accession of Charles III as King of Tuvalu following the death of Queen Elizabeth II.
 18 September – A State Memorial Service takes place in Funafuti for Elizabeth II, Queen of Tuvalu.
 19 September – Tuvaluan representatives attend the funeral of Queen Elizabeth II in London.

Deaths 
 22 May – Minute Alapati Taupo, politician, deputy prime minister (since 2019), ambassador to Taiwan (2013–2017) (born 1962)
 8 September – Elizabeth II, Queen of Tuvalu since 1978 (born 1926)

References 

 
Tuvalu
Tuvalu
2020s in Tuvalu